is a Japanese manga series written and illustrated by Shoki Satō. It was first serialized in Akita Shoten's shōnen manga magazine Weekly Shōnen Champion from January 2020 to November 2022 and it was later transferred to Manga Cross in December 2022.

Publication
Written and illustrated by Shoki Satō, Meika-san wa Oshi Korosenai started in Akita Shoten's shōnen manga magazine Weekly Shōnen Champion on January 23, 2020, until November 24, 2022. The series was transferred to Manga Cross on December 8, 2022. Akita Shoten has collected its chapters into individual tankōbon volumes. The first volume was released on July 8, 2020. As of March 8, 2023, eleven volumes have been released.

Volume list

References

External links
  
  

Akita Shoten manga
Comedy anime and manga
Maids in fiction
Shōnen manga